A list of characters from To Heart and To Heart 2.

To Heart

Main characters

Hiroyuki is the main male character and has a very dry attitude. He is surprisingly empathetic though, but usually shows it through his actions rather than what he says or how he acts towards people. Hiroyuki is also a childhood friend of Akari, and gradually throughout the storyline falls in love with her. He is sometimes dense when it comes to romance.

Akari is Hiroyuki's childhood friend. She will almost always go to wake Hiroyuki up in the morning to go to school. She is especially fond of teddy bears, with special emphasis on the one that Hiroyuki gave her during their childhood. Both Akari and Hiroyuki have known each other since kindergarten and they are extremely close. She is very much in love with Hiroyuki and spends a lot of time around him. Akari likes to call Hiroyuki "Hiroyuki-chan" even though he hates being called that. Akari is very adept at cooking and is a member of the school's cooking club.

In the game, she is just one of several female characters, but in the anime she adopts a central role, acting as narrator, with her romantic aspirations forming the main recurring theme of the series. In one episode (#7) she actually supplants Hiroyuki as the main character when she befriends the psychic girl Kotone: in all other episodes it is Hiroyuki who befriends the "guest" character of the episode. (In the manga Akari has a less pivotal role (though still a major one), and it is Hiroyuki who befriends Kotone.)

In To Heart: Remember My Memories, her normally optimistic and somewhat naive personality takes on a more depressed and emotional tone when Hiroyuki begins to pay less attention to her and more to the android Multi, and her relationship with Hiroyuki nearly fell apart.

Shiho first met Akari, Hiroyuki and Masashi during the first year of junior-high school. She is more of a tomboy than Akari, and often finds herself at odds with Hiroyuki, but towards the end of the 1st Anime series she starts to develop feelings for Hiroyuki, but later decides her friendship with Akari is more important. She is feisty and aggressive, yet close to Akari. She is a real gossip fanatic, often coming up with random ideas that she titles "Shiho's News Flash" or "Shiho's Advice". Most of what goes on in school and the students do not pass by her unnoticed. However, according to Hiroyuki, "90% of what she says isn't true." Though this is a bit of a hyperbole, Shiho does sometimes get her facts wrong.

An experimental humanoid maid robot from the HM (Human Maiden) series robots made by Kurusugawa Electronics. She was sent to Fujita's school to learn how to behave like a human. Multi is a very cheerful girl who loves to clean. Unfortunately, she isn't very good at it nor household chores, which contradicts her purpose. In the anime, Hiroyuki and Akari help Multi to improve her skills. In order to charge her batteries, she needs to be connected to a laptop with a cable stored in her hand. She becomes a central character in To Heart: Remember My Memories when she appears to have had her memories erased (particularly those of her times spent with Hiroyuki), resulting in a dilemma for Hiroyuki and inadvertently causing grief for Akari. She makes a unofficial guest appearance in the 3rd Touhou Project game, Phantasmagoria of Dim. Dream in Reimu Hakurei's ending.

Tomoko is a native of Kobe and speaks the Kansai dialect. She has a very serious, responsible nature, and serves as the class president. Her seriousness is conveyed by her tightly bound hair and coke-bottle glasses, though she is quite pretty when she removes these features (in fact, the change is so drastic that in To Heart: Remember My Memories Hiroyuki and company don't recognize her at all when they encounter her in Kobe, until she puts on her glasses and holds her hair in a ponytail). It is hinted that she might have liked Hiroyuki in To Heart: Remember My Memories as she said he was slow when he asked her why she told him about her family's past. She moved from Kobe as a result of problems between her parents. Her quiet and concentrated nature is one of her ways of hiding her problems and she will often keep to herself.

Serika is a member of the Kurusugawa family, which is extremely wealthy and operates a conglomerate of companies in their name, including the labs which produced Multi and Serio. She speaks very quietly and it is very difficult to hear what she says unless standing right beside her - as a result, we often see Hiroyuki repeat what she just said. She is addressed as "ojō-sama" (a very respectful title) by the family servants and is picked up by a limousine everyday. Serika is also very much into the occult and is the sole member of the school's Occult Research Club. She is also often protected by her butler, Sebastian. In To Heart: Remember My Memories, she demonstrates the level of authority she has over the Kurusugawa group by overruling the security of a Kurusugawa-owned Amusement Park when Hiroyuki and company try to break into it at night.

Ayaka is Serika's younger sister. Despite looking similar, they have totally different character personalities. Ayaka is very outgoing and confident, and enjoys martial arts. They get along very well, but go to different schools and have different paths in life.

Lemmy is half American, half Japanese - her full name is Lemmy Christopher Helen Miyauchi. She speaks Japanese with a stereotypical American accent, and often makes mistakes with the meanings of Japanese sayings. She also has a tendency to slip in English words during conversations when she has the chance. She also ends a lot of her sentences with "-ne" and overuses the word "fantastic".  Near the end of To Heart: Remember My Memories she admits to Hiroyuki that she has always loved him and wants him to return to America with her so he can go to a good school with robotic engineering. She is exceptionally tall and is the only major character who is taller than Hiroyuki. Her height, bust, blue eyes, blonde hair, and unusual personality is how her foreign blood is represented which is typical of many Japanese series that contain foreigners. Note that a picture shows that she has black hair originally. Lemmy is also a member of the kyūdō club (Japanese archery).

She is a practitioner of a particular style of martial arts known as "Extreme Rules" (i.e., mixed martial arts). However, because she doesn't adhere to the more traditional martial arts such as Karate, she is spurned by the mainstream martial artists. She is still a very determined girl. She idolizes Ayaka Kurusugawa since the latter also happens to practice the same "Extreme Rules" form of martial arts. She possibly likes Hiroyuki as shown during her conversation with Yoshikata, as the latter described Kotone as "Aoi's rival for that guy", which she replies "I guess you could say it that way".

A girl with psychic powers, but is unable to fully control them. When she was introduced, it is revealed that she does not have control over her psychic powers; instead bottling them up until she can no longer restrain them anymore, causing devastation. She likes udon. Her psychic power is psychokinesis in the game, and prediction in the anime series. This has changed back into psychokinesis in To Heart: Remember My Memories. She had a crush on Masashi in the first season, though in Remember My Memories, she admits to being in love with Hiroyuki, and her relationship with Masashi not mentioned.

She can be unlocked after completing Akari's scenario. She spends time on getting part-time jobs, and is a fan of romance manga and anime. She is very self-sufficient, and has several part-time jobs including selling cakes at Christmas and delivering the paper.  She has feelings for Hiroyuki. She has the feature of "hair antennae" (a pair of long hairs that stick straight up), which is rampant in some anime but unique in this one.

Secondary characters

Masashi is Hiroyuki's closest male friend. He grew up with Hiroyuki and Akari, and attended the same kindergarten and Junior High School. He is adept at football and generally has a soft, friendly character. Near the end of To Heart: Remember My Memories he admits to Akari that he loves her.

Serio is Multi's younger sister: an advanced successor of Multi, but without emotions. Serio was sent with Ayaka to Sanyo Girls' School for field testing and speaks using formal Japanese. She is technically superior to Multi and is equipped with a satellite system capable of communicating with and storing data on the Kurusagawa mainframe host computer. Serio is more effective than Multi as a maid robot but because she lacks emotions, does not feel as human. She does have a heart, and tries to help people even though she may fail as she is unable to understand the complex emotional aspects behind them - an issue dealt with in the drama CD Piece of Heart. At the end of To Heart: Remember My Memories, she does eventually exhibit emotion, shedding tears for Multi.

Minor characters

Captain of the karate club (where Aoi used to be a member).
 Researcher of Multi and Serio from Kurusugawa Electronics.
 Rio's younger brother.
 Rio and Ryota's younger sister.

Hiroyuki's classmate in their second year.
 Hiroyuki's classmate in their second year.
 Masashi's friend from soccer team.
 A character from the PC version of To Heart.
 A character from PC version of To Heart.
 Heart to Heart radio show host.

To Heart 2

Main characters

Takaaki is the main male character. He is unvoiced and unseen in the game and makes his first appearance in the anime. Takaaki is childhood friends with Konomi and Tamaki and sees them as a younger sister and older sister, respectively. In the anime, it is noted that he has an aversion to most girls except for Konomi and Tamaki, whom he has gotten used to, having known them since childhood. He is a kind young man who, despite his shy nature around girls, is often very kind to them when the situation arises. In the beginning of the story, his parents leave him home alone because of business. In the anime, he has blackish green hair instead of brown like he does in the games. This was corrected in the OVAs.

Konomi is the main heroine of To Heart 2, and a childhood friend of Takaaki, his next door neighbor.  Konomi has a childish and energetic personality and sometimes refer to herself in the third person. She often tries to cook, although Takaaki states that she is unable to prepare anything except tamagoyaki. Konomi is one year younger than Takaaki, and is still a junior high school student when the story begins, but attends Takaaki's high school come the new school term. She harbours feelings for Takaaki since they were children.

Tamaki is childhood friends with both Konomi and Takaaki, who see her as an older sister. She started attending an all-girls boarding school when they were both children and consequently has not seen as much of them as she used to. She transfers to their high school for her final year, fulfilling a promise she made Takaaki and Konomi. In the game, she is one year ahead of Takaaki. She is very confident and comes from a rich family. She is well versed in traditional Japanese arts and traditions, yet still is a modern girl in her own right. In her circle of friends consisting of Konomi, Takaaki and Yūji, she is the strong and dominant personality and acts as the older-sister figure. She often addresses herself as "Tama-oneechan". In the game's Tamaki scenario, she is followed by a group of three girls from her boarding school.

Manaka is one of the protagonist's classmates and the class representative. Although she likes, and is willing, to help others, few people realize that she is overburdened by the extra work this entails. Despite being a good class rep, she has a fairly docile personality otherwise. Manaka assists the library club in marking archived books for barcoding, which causes a few problems since she is not a member. Has a talent for blending tea, which she does as a hobby. She is shy around boys, something Takaaki can empathize with. Despite being busy helping everyone at school, she still makes time to visit her younger sister, Ikuno, who is in the hospital suffering from the complications due to diabetes. She develops a crush on Takaaki, and becomes very comfortable with interacting with him as time passes.

Yuma is in the same grade as the protagonist but in a different class and is close friends with Manaka. She is very high-strung and aggressive, and like to ride her bike, but has an unfortunate tendency to collide with Takaaki resulting in many embarrassing situations. This is not helped by the fact that she always blames Takaaki, and challenges him to duels in which things always end up worse off than they began. Whenever she loses to Takaaki, she points to him and says, "Don't think you've already won this!" Her family is rich and she is being trained to take over her grandfather's business.

Karin is in the same grade as Takaaki and the founder and only member of the "mystery club" before she manages to blackmail Takaaki into joining. Despite the name, the "Mystery Club" does not really read mystery novels or engage in real-life detective work, but is more a club for the occult, the supernatural, and the unexplained. Most of the other students consider Karin an oddball, not only because of her interest in UFOs, but because of little things such as her love for egg sandwiches and tendency to sing an odd nursery rhyme about eggs.

Lucy is an alien that can communicate with animals. Notable also for other traits, like using matchsticks as currency, writing in Egyptian hieroglyphs, raising her arms and saying "rū" (which becomes her silly way of greeting people), and referring to all humans as "ū".

Sango is the older Himeyuri twin. She is one year younger than the protagonist, and helped develop the next generation maid gynoids for Kurusugawa Electronics. While she is quite bright when it comes to technical matters, she is quite naive and almost childish. Despite her childish attitude, Sango appears to be the "older sister" of the pair and often gives advice to her twin sister, Ruri. Both she and Ruri, speak with an extremely strong Kansai region dialect.

Ruri is the younger Himeyuri twin. She is one year younger than the protagonist and is in the same class as Sango. She is fiercely protective and possessive of her sister, and when Sango finds herself attracted to Takaaki, Ruri becomes jealous and even hostile towards him. She is an excellent cook but unlike her twin sister, Ruri is not very bright and cannot develop robots.

Yūki is a mysterious girl whom Takaaki meets in school at night. She carries around a notebook called the "Trash Basket Notebook". In the anime, she is seen in a flashback in Episode 13 as a young girl who is crying because she is moving away.

Sasara is a new heroine who appears in the releases subsequent to the PlayStation 2 version. She is one year older than the protagonist and student council vice-president (later the president.) She has a cold demeanor and strict attitude and as a result, her only friend is Māryan. When it is time for Māryan to graduate, Sasara is saddened because her only friend will be leaving her and she even tries to convince Māryan not to graduate. Takaaki becomes acquainted with her after he is volunteered to help the student council with an event, but when Sasara becomes president, she appoints him as student council vice-president. While working with Takaaki in the student council she develops a crush on him.

Mio is a new heroine who was added to the PlayStation 3 version of the game. Although she is in the same class as Takaaki, she often remains unnoticed by other students to the extent that her name is unknown to most of them. She originally ties her hair up and wears eyeglasses, but later, on advice from Takaaki, wears contact lenses and her hair down in an attempt to change the impression she gives to others.

Additional heroines in Another Days

A highly energetic girl who appears out of nowhere and suddenly declares herself to be Takaaki's lover, calling him "darling" and kissing him within moments of introducing herself to him.

A senior, as well as a former student council president. She only appeared in the PC version of To Heart 2, where she attempted to pair up Takaaki (the main character) and Sasara Kusugawa (the female character added in the PC version). In To Heart 2, she was notable for using the trademark tendencies of others, e.g., Lucy Maria Misora's "rū", but she mostly uses the word "mā" which is part of her name. Her full name (which was identified only in this game) is Maako Asagiri. She is referred to as "Māryan Senpai" by Takaaki.

Class representative Manaka Komaki's younger sister. In To Heart 2, she has a chronic illness that keeps her in the hospital. In Another Days, she moves about outside of hospital, including in school, on a wheelchair for most of her story unlike in "To Heart 2".

Nicknamed , she is one of Konomi's two main friends from junior-high school. She is more energetic and has green hair. She has the tendency to add "su" to the end of her sentences. She is hell bent on getting Konomi and Takaaki together, not realizing what's in store for herself. She goes to a private school near the protagonist's school.

Nicknamed , she is one of Konomi's friend from junior-high school. She is soft-spoken and wears glasses. She goes to a private school near the protagonist's school.

A girl from a primary school. She appeared in Lucy Maria Misora's scenario, believing her to be a magician.

A robot, she is model HMX-17c, making her a "sister" of sorts to "Ilfa". She was previously only mentioned in the game. She was shipped to Takaaki's home to serve as his personal maid. Her housekeeping performance however leaves a lot to be desired, plus she's quite emotional for a robot, to the point that she needs to be "disciplined" by Ilfa. She is however extremely shy, if not downright scared, when trying to interact with other people in the society, to the point of being called a "hikki(komori)" by Harumi and has a tendency to cover herself with and stay underneath a cardboard box all the time.

Konomi's mother. She is friendly towards Takaaki, enough to entrust him with her own daughter overnight. She often calls him over to eat breakfast or dinner with them.

Secondary characters

Tamaki's younger brother and the protagonist's best friend and classmate. He fills in the role of "perverted friend". He is often interested in other girls unlike Tamaki, and is often the victim of his elder sister's ire in the form of painful forehead-crushing grips. He often gets jealous of Takaaki "taking" all the girls. He likes cameras, but he likes taking pictures of girls more.

Yuma's grandfather, and served under Kurusugawa family as butler.

The newest experimental maid robot from Kurusugawa Electronics, driven by software called 'Dynamic Intelligence Architecture' designed by Sango. The body is customized from the mass-produced HMX-16 'Leon'. Ilfa proposes to work at Sango and Ruri's house during her testing phase which angers Ruri because she takes all her jobs. Even though she is hated by Ruri, Ilfa loves her because Ruri is the one who shows her that the outside world is not frightening. In the anime OVA, Ilfa is asked to serve at Yūji's house because he has a maid gynoid fetish which becomes a learning experience for her thanks to Tamaki.

The original chairman when protagonist was in year one.

A student one school year older than protagonist.

Konomi's very large pet dog, an Old English Sheepdog.

References

Fictional robots
To Heart
ToHeart